The Irresponsible Captain Tylor anime and OVA series is based on The Most Irresponsible Man in Space series of light novels by Hitoshi Yoshioka. The series began as a 26-part TV series broadcast on TV Tokyo and ran from January 25 to July 19, 1993. All episodes were directed by Kōichi Mashimo, and were produced by Tatsunoko Production. The OVA was a 10-part series released between October 1, 1994 and August 1, 1996. All episodes were directed between Mashimo and Koji Sawai, and were produced by Studio Deen. The story follows the career of Justy Ueki Tylor, a young man who decided to join the United Planets Space Force believing it will lead to an easy life. He later finds himself in command of his own spaceship, the Soyokaze, where he finds himself at odds with his military enemy, the Raalgon Empire, and his own crew due to his laid-back manner.

The TV series featured an opening and closing performed by Mari Sasaki: "Just Think Of Tomorrow" and "Downtown Dance" respectively. They, along with the rest of the soundtrack for both the TV series and OVA were released by AnimeTrax on June 5, 2001.

The TV series was released in the United States by Right Stuf first on VHS between October 21, 1997 and July 21, 1998, and was later released on DVD on January 30, 2001. The OVA was released on DVD between July 31 and September 25, 2001. The series was released as a digitally remastered thinkpak by Right Stuf's division Nozomi Entertainment, with the TV series released on May 26, 2009 and the OVA on August 28, 2009.

Episodes

TV series

OVA
Episodes 3-8 take place concurrently with episode 9-10 and act as side stories focusing on individual crew members that slot in to the final episodes narrative.

References
General

Specific

Irresponsible Captain Tylor